T1 is a bus route operated by First West of England that runs between Bristol and Thornbury.

History
The route was launched in May 2018 as part of a rebrand to First's Thornbury and Yate routes. It was the first regular service to use the new Stoke Gifford bypass.

In September 2020, the frequency of the service was reduced from every 20 minutes to every 30 minutes.

In August 2021, the frequency of the Sunday service was reduced from every 30 minutes to hourly.

In October 2022, the southern terminus was changed to Bristol bus station. The route no longer serves The Centre and Bristol Royal Infirmary.

Route
The bus leaves Bristol heading north bound on the M32 to Junction 1 at Hambrook where the bus leaves the motorway and briefly joins the A4174 Avon Ring Road before turning onto the Stoke Gifford By-pass through Harry Stoke. The bus passes through the town of Bradley Stoke on the main road through the town 'Bradley Stoke Way' and upon reaching Aztec West Roundabout, joins the A38 Gloucester Road. The T1 crosses the M5 motorway at Aztec West (J16) and follows the A38 through the village of Almondsbury to the junction with the B4061. The bus then leaves the A38 and follows the B4061 into Thornbury town centre. In Thornbury, the bus makes a loop around the town before returning to Bristol.

Vehicles
When the route was first launched in 2018, it was operated using Alexander Dennis Enviro400 MMCs. In March 2020, 13 brand new Enviro 400 City powered by Compressed Natural Gas were introduced onto the South Glos Lynx network of routes including the T1.

References 

Bus routes in England
Transport in Bristol